The Feira Franca is a medieval festival held in Pontevedra (Spain) on Friday afternoon and Saturday of the first weekend in September. It is set in the Middle Ages and includes a medieval market, a chivalry tournament, falconry shows, food stalls, street entertainment, juggling, music, workshops, leather, wood, textile and natural products crafts, and more.

In 2013, it was declared a festival of tourist interest by the Galician Government. Today, it brings together some 100,000 people who dress up in period costumes to take part in the festivities.

History and description 
The Feira Franca has its origins in the tax-free market, which began to take place in the city through a royal privilege established by King Henry IV in 1467, with the celebration of a month-long festival around 24 August in honour of Saint Bartholomew. In the medieval Fairs, the highest and lowest social classes met.

The first edition took place in 2000, and has since attracted a large number of visitors. People wear medieval-inspired costumes and the old town centre undergoes a major aesthetic transformation. Locals and visitors are encouraged to join in the festivities with carts and horses in the streets, prisoners on the gallows or with Blacksmiths and other medieval characters.

For several years now, each fair has been dedicated to a theme. In 2006 it was dedicated to the Irmandiños, in 2007 to the sea and in 2008 to agriculture. In the tenth edition in 2009 the Fair was named Love, Mockery and Curses, in homage to the medieval songs made in the Galician language. In 2010 the theme was walkers, in 2011 old-time trade and in 2012 popular games. In 2013, it is devoted to Inventions, in 2014 to astronomy, in 2015 to alchemy, in 2016 to music, in 2017 to medieval bestiaries and in 2018 to legends. Since 2019 the Feira Franca has not been dedicated to a specific theme.

Gallery

References

See also

Related articles 
 King Henry IV of Castile

External links 
 www.feirafranca.pontevedra.gal+

Pontevedra
Renaissance fair
September events
Festivals in Spain
Food and drink festivals in Spain
Galician culture
Festivals established in 2000
Tourist attractions in Galicia (Spain)
Fairs
History of Pontevedra